Bobnice is a municipality and village in Nymburk District in the Central Bohemian Region of the Czech Republic. It has about 800 inhabitants.

Administrative parts
The village of Kovansko is an administrative part of Bobnice.

References

Villages in Nymburk District